Fēnix is a steel Wing coaster located at Toverland in Sevenum, the Netherlands. It is a Wing Coaster manufactured by Bolliger & Mabillard. The attraction opened on 7 July 2018. Fēnix is as part of Avalon, a new area with a theme based on Celtic legends. It was also the first Wing Coaster in the Netherlands.

Ride experience
The ride has 3 inversions: a dive drop, an Immelmann, and zero-g roll.

As the train exits the station it takes a 180 degree right-hand turn before climbing the 40 metre (131 ft) chain lift hill. At the hill's crest, the train takes a 90 degree right hand turn before proceeding down the dive drop. Reaching speeds of 95 kilometres per hour (59 mph), the train travels over an airtime hill before entering an Immelmann loop. The train then enters a 360 degree right hand helix leading into a zero-g roll. Following the zero-g roll, the train travels through a headchopper and a series of banked turns before entering the brake run and station.

See also
2018 in amusement parks

References

Roller coasters in the Netherlands